Jessy Gálvez López (born 17 July 1995) is a Belgian professional footballer who plays as a left winger for Rebecq.

Career
López joined RAAL La Louvière ahead of the 2019-20 season.

On 16 March 2021, López signed with Rebecq alongside Quentin Laurent.

References

External links

1995 births
Living people
Belgian footballers
R. Charleroi S.C. players
Cercle Brugge K.S.V. players
Belgian Pro League players
Challenger Pro League players
Association football defenders
R. Châtelet S.C. players
R.U.S. Rebecquoise players
RAAL La Louvière players
Belgian people of Spanish descent
Sportspeople from Charleroi
Footballers from Hainaut (province)